Thomas or Tom Randall  may refer to:

 Thomas Randolph (diplomat) (1525/6–1590),  Thomas Randall
 Thomas Randolph (poet) (1605–1635), English poet and dramatist, aka Thomas Randall
 Thomas Randall (MP for Truro)
 Thomas Randall, headmaster of Durham School
 Tom Randall (American football), American football player
 Tom Randall (politician), British MP for Gedling